Mads Pedersen may refer to:
 Mads Pedersen (canoeist) (born 1996), Danish canoeist
 Mads Pedersen (cyclist) (born 1995), Danish cyclist
 Mads Pedersen (footballer, born 1993), Danish footballer
 Mads Valentin, Danish footballer
 Mads Pedersen (badminton) (born 1990), Danish badminton player